The Plus 15 or +15 is a Skyway network in Calgary, Alberta. It is the world's most extensive pedestrian skywalk system, with a total length of 16 kilometres (10 miles) and 86 bridges connecting 130 buildings as of 2022. Calgary often has severe winters and the walkways allow people to get around the city's downtown more quickly and comfortably. The busiest parts of the network saw over 20,000 pedestrians per day in a 2018 count.

The system is so named because the skywalks are approximately 15 feet (approximately 4.5 metres) above street level. Some Plus 15 skywalks are multi-level, with higher levels being referred to as Plus 30s and Plus 45s.

History

The system was conceived and designed by architect Harold Hanen, who worked for the Calgary Planning Department from 1966 to 1969. This development earned him the 1970 Vincent Massey Award for Merit in Urban Planning.

Opening in 1970, the Plus 15 network has expanded to include 86 enclosed bridges connecting 130 downtown Calgary buildings. The central core of the system is a series of enclosed shopping centres, and the city's flagship department stores.

New developments were required to connect to the walkway system; in exchange for this, they were offered more floorspace (the "bonus density"). When not physically able to connect to nearby buildings, developers contribute to the "Plus 15 Fund", managed by the city, used to finance other missing connections.

Impact
The system has been identified with a decline in street life in the Downtown Commercial Core. Street life is instead concentrated on streets (such as Stephen Avenue) or in neighbourhoods where there are no bridges (such as Eau Claire and Beltline).

In 1998, the city began to re-evaluate the system. Part of the goal of these studies was reinvigorating decreased daytime street life on some downtown streets. The possibility of limiting expansion to encourage more pedestrian street traffic was raised. Critics continue to claim the system is detrimental to culture and economic activity at ground level, however proponents argue that its heavy use points to how useful and convenient it is in cold weather.

The system's bridges are integral to the buildings they serve. City planning by-laws now confer tax credits to owners who connect new buildings to the system. Businesses and the general public make extensive use of the system's enhanced flow of human traffic.

List of connected buildings

333 5th Avenue
444 7th Avenue
505 3rd Street
606 4th Street
635 8th Avenue
715 5th Avenue
736 6th Avenue
840 7th Avenue
Amec Place
Alberta Energy Utilities Board
Altius Centre
Andrew Davison Building
Aquitaine Tower
Atrium I
Atrium II
Bank of Canada
Bankers Court
Bankers Hall
Banker's Hall Parkade
Bantrel Tower
Bow Parkade
Bow Valley College
Bow Valley Square
420FOURTH (formerly BP Centre)
Brookfield Place (Calgary)
Calgary Board of Education
Calgary House
Calgary Marriott Hotel
Calgary Place
Calgary Tower
Canada Place
Canadian Fina Building
Canterra Tower
Carter House
Centennial Parkade
Centennial Place
Centre Four
Century Park Place
Chamber of Commerce
Chevron Plaza
City Centre Parkade
City Hall
City/Omni Building
Convention Centre North
Convention Centre South
Core Shopping Centre (Formerly TD Square/Calgary Eaton Centre)
Daon Building
Delta Bow Valley Inn
Devonian Gardens
Dome Tower
Dominion Centre
Eau Claire Place II
Eighth Avenue Place
Elveden Centre
Emerson Centre
Encana Place
Encor Place
Epcore Centre
Ernst and Young Tower
Fairmont Palliser Hotel
Fifth and Fifth
Fifth Avenue Place
First Alberta Place
First Canadian Centre
Fourth and Fourth
Fracmaster Tower
Glenbow Museum
Gulf Canada Square
Hanover Place
Harry Hayes Government of Canada
Hawthorn Hotel and Suites
Hollinsworth Building
Holt Renfrew Department Store
Home Oil Tower
Hyatt Regency Hotel
Intact Place
International Hotel
Iveagh House
J.J. Bowen Building
Jamieson Place
Lancaster Building
Life Plaza
Livingston Place
London House
Mobil Tower
Monenco Place
Municipal Building
Nexen Building
Northland Building
Northland Place
Palliser South
Palliser Square
Panarctic Centre
Pertogen Building
Petex Building
Petroleum Building
Place 800
Old Police Headquarters Building 
Provincial Court
Ramada Hotel
Rocky Mountain Court
Rocky Mountain Plaza
Roslyn Building
Royal Bank
Sandman Inn
Sanjel Building
Scotia Bank Tower
Scotia Centre
Selkirk House
Shell Centre
Sheraton Suites
St. Regis Hotel
Standard Life
Stock Exchange Tower
Suncor Energy Centre
Sun Life Plaza
TD Canada Trust Tower
TELUS House Calgary
The Bay Department Store
The Bow
TC Energy Tower (formerly TransCanada Tower)
Trimac House
Watermark Tower
Western Canadian Place
Western Union
Westin Hotel
Workers Compensation Board Office
YWCA

In popular culture 
The Plus 15 is one of the central plot elements in the 2000 film Waydowntown, directed by Gary Burns.

See also

 List of attractions and landmarks in Calgary
 Skyway
 Edmonton Pedway
 Underground City, Montreal
 PATH (Toronto)

References

External links
City of Calgary PDF Map 
 Plus 15 Map with iPhone app
 Plus 15 Ninja - Directions, Meetups & Directory

Buildings and structures completed in 1970
Buildings and structures in Calgary
Modernist architecture in Canada
Pedways in Canada
Skyways
Transport in Calgary
Tourist attractions in Calgary
1970 establishments in Alberta